Dream 1: Lightweight Grand Prix 2008 1st Round was the inaugural event of the mixed martial arts promotion, Dream. It took place on Saturday, on March 15, 2008 at the Saitama Super Arena in Saitama City, Japan.

The evening's main event was a match featuring last year's Hero's Middleweight Champion, J.Z. Calvancanti of Brazil and Japanese judoka Shinya Aoki. All bouts were fought under Dream mixed martial arts rules, with a 10 min first and 5 min second round. It attracted a sellout crowd of 19,120 and was broadcast live across Japan on the TBS television network.

Results

Notes
 The 8th matchup of the tournament was initially to be postponed until Dream 2 due to the injuries of Vítor Ribeiro and Caol Uno along with Gilbert Melendez's prior commitment to Strikeforce. Dream officials have decided to directly seed Caol Uno into the 2nd round against Mitsuhiro Ishida as the 8th fighter.
 André Amado was hospitalized after losing to Eddie Alvarez and was unavailable for the Post-fight interviews
 Dream 1 announced attendance was 19,120 and its reported TV ratings on TBS were 8.9% 
 7 of the Fighters for Dream 2's 2008 Middleweight Grand Prix were announced:
 Kazushi Sakuraba
 Yoon Dong-Sik
 Yoshihiro Akiyama
 Shungo Oyama
 Taiei Kin
 Masakatsu Funaki
 Ikuhisa Minowa

See also 
 Dream (mixed martial arts)
 List of Dream champions
 2008 in DREAM

References

Dream (mixed martial arts) events
2008 in mixed martial arts
Mixed martial arts in Japan
Sport in Saitama (city)
2008 in Japan